The Ministry of Culture is the Indian government ministry charged with preservation and promotion of art and culture of India.

G. Kishan Reddy is the current Minister of Culture. Recently the government has established the National Mission on Libraries India under this ministry.

Characteristics
The restoration of ancient idols smuggled out of India comes under the Ministry of Culture.

As of 01 October 2021, the Government of India has recovered 211 idols.
Till 2014 only 13 idols were recovered. 198 idols have been restored since 2014.

In June 2022, more than 10 idols were recovered and handed over to the Tamil Nadu Idol Rescue Unit. 228 idols have been recovered till 2022.

Organisation
Attached offices
Archaeological Survey of India
Central Secretariat Library
National Archives of India
Subordinate offices
Anthropological Survey of India, Kolkata
Central Reference Library, Kolkata
National Research Laboratory for Conservation of Cultural Property, Lucknow
National Gallery of Modern Art, New Delhi
National Gallery of Modern Art, Mumbai
National Gallery of Modern Art, Bengaluru
National Library of India, Kolkata
National Museum, New Delhi
Autonomous organisations
 National Mission for Manuscripts, Delhi
 Allahabad Museum, Prayagraj
Asiatic Society, Kolkata
Central Institute of Buddhist Studies, Jammu and Kashmir
Central Institute of Higher Tibetan Studies (CIHTS)
Centre for Cultural Resources and Training, New Delhi
Delhi Public Library, Delhi
Gandhi Smriti and Darshan Samiti, New Delhi
Indian Museum, Kolkata
Indira Gandhi National Centre for the Arts (IGNCA), New Delhi
Indira Gandhi Rashtriya Manava Sangrahalaya, Bhopal
Kalakshetra Foundation, Thiruvanmiyur, Chennai
Khuda Baksh Oriental Public Library, Patna
Lalit Kala Academy, New Delhi
Maulana Abul Kalam Azad Institute of Asian Studies (MAKAIAS), Kolkata
National Council of Science Museums, Kolkata
National Museum Institute of the History of Art, Conservation and Museology (NMIHACM), Delhi
National School of Drama, New Delhi
Nav Nalanda Mahavihara, Nalanda, Bihar
Nehru Memorial Museum and Library, New Delhi (Teen Murti Bhavan)
Raja Ram Mohan Roy Library Foundation, Kolkata, registered under the West Bengal Societies Registration Act, 1961
Raza Library, Rampur
Sahitya Akademi (SA), New Delhi
Salar Jung Museum, Hyderabad
Sangeet Natak Akademi (SNA), New Delhi
Saraswathi Mahal Library, Tanjore
Victoria Memorial Hall, Kolkata
Zonal Cultural Centers (based on Cultural Zones of India)
Eastern Zonal Cultural Centre, Kolkata
North Central Zone Cultural Centre, Allahabad
North East Zone Cultural Centre
North Zone Cultural Centre
South Central Zone Cultural Centre, Nagpur
South Zone Culture Centre, Tanjavur, Tamil Nadu
West Zone Cultural Centre

Ministers of Culture

List of Ministers of State

Department of Culture (State Ministers)

References

External links

Official website

 
Culture
Indian culture
India